Hilarios Karl-Heinz Ungerer (born 1941 in Nuremberg) is a bishop of the Free Catholic Church in Munich, a small Independent Catholic denomination. Ungerer, with Bishop Roberto Garrido Padin, ordained Bishop Rómulo Antonio Braschi in 1998, who ordained a group of women known as the Danube Seven in 2002.

History
In 1967, Ungerer was ordained as a priest in the independent Catholic church movement in Germany twice, and was consecrated as a bishop several years later.

Ungerer opened a storefront church in Munich. In 1976,  On 6 October 1976 Ungerer was consecrated  as a bishop by Mariavite Bishop Norbert Maas, but on 8 August 1978 he was separated from that association.

Since then Ungerer has led the Free Catholic Church in Germany,

Notes

References 

1941 births
20th-century German bishops
Living people
Archbishops of the Free Catholic Church
German bishops
21st-century German bishops